Felix Thornley Cobbold (8 September 1841 Ipswich – 6 December 1909) was a British banker, barrister and Liberal Party politician.  He was a member of the Ipswich Cobbold brewing family but not a brewer himself.

Life
Felix was born in Holywells Mansion, Ipswich. He was the son of John Cobbold, Member of Parliament for Ipswich, and his wife Lucy, daughter of Henry Patteson (sometime Rector of Drinkstone and of Wortham, Suffolk). John Cobbold, Thomas Cobbold and Nathaniel Cobbold, grandfather of Cameron Cobbold, 1st Baron Cobbold, were his elder brothers. He was educated at King's College, Cambridge, and later became a senior fellow of this college. Cobbold also sat as Member of Parliament for Stowmarket in Suffolk between 1885 and 1886, and for Ipswich between 1906 and his death.  Although he opposed Irish Home Rule originally, he returned to the Liberal Party as an advanced Radical.  In 1895 he presented Christchurch Mansion to the town of Ipswich as part of an arrangement to preserve the mansion and surrounding Christchurch Park from development.  He also bequeathed Gippeswyk Park to Ipswich. Cobbold died in December 1909, aged 68.

See also
Baron Cobbold

References

Sources

Further reading

Clive Hodges: Cobbold & Kin: Life Stories from an East Anglian Family (Woodbridge, Boydell Press, 2014)

External links 
 

1841 births
1909 deaths
UK MPs 1885–1886
UK MPs 1906–1910
Liberal Party (UK) MPs for English constituencies
Members of the Parliament of the United Kingdom for Ipswich
Felix Cobbold
Alumni of King's College, Cambridge
Fellows of King's College, Cambridge
English barristers
Mayors of Ipswich, Suffolk